Township 5 can refer to:
Township 5, Harper County, Kansas
Township 5, Washington County, Nebraska